The Men's 100 metre freestyle competition at the 2017 World Championships was held on 26 and 27 July 2017.

Records
Prior to the competition, the existing world and championship records were as follows.

Results

Heats
The heats were held on 26 July at 09:45.

Semifinals
The semifinals were held on 26 July at 17:41.

Semifinal 1

Semifinal 2

Final
The final was held on 27 July at 17:51.

References

Men's 100 metre freestyle